Auguste Jean Stecher (1820–1909) was a Belgian literary historian and literary critic, sometimes writing under the pen name Lieven Everwyn, who was a professor at Ghent University and University of Liège and a contributor to the Biographie Nationale de Belgique. His magnum opus was a 4-volume edition of the works of Jean Lemaire de Belges.

Life
Stecher was born in Ghent on 11 October 1820. His parents kept a hotel in the city. He studied at the state secondary school and the state university there, obtaining a doctorate in 1841. He began teaching at the University of Ghent, in 1850 transferring to the University of Liège.

He was elected a corresponding member of the Royal Academy of Science, Letters and Fine Arts of Belgium on 8 May 1876 and a full member on 9 May 1881.

Stecher died in Liège on 3 September 1909.

Works
As author
 (as Lieven Everwyn), Korte levensschets van Jacob Van Artevelde (Ghent, 1845)
 (as Lieven Everwyn), De eerste Fransche Revolutie (Ghent, 1848)
 Flamands et Wallons (Liège, 1859)
 Étude sur les proverbes (Liège, 1861)
 Histoire de la Littérature néerlandaise en Belgique (Brussels, 1886)

As editor
 Oeuvres de Jean Lemaire de Belges (4 vols., Leuven, 1882-1891)

As translator
 Hendrik Conscience, La Guerre des Paysans (2 vols., Liège, 1853)

Articles
 "Le Drame réaliste au Moyen Age", Revue de Belgique, vol. 34 (1880)

References

1820 births
1909 deaths
Academic staff of Ghent University
Academic staff of the University of Liège
Members of the Royal Academy of Belgium